Kruglovo is a rural locality (a selo) in Sergeikhinskoye Rural Settlement, Kameshkovsky District, Vladimir Oblast, Russia. The population was 51 as of 2010.

Geography 
Kruglovo is located 20 km west of Kameshkovo (the district's administrative centre) by road. Pigasovo is the nearest rural locality.

References 

Rural localities in Kameshkovsky District
Suzdalsky Uyezd